was a Japanese painter and printmaker in the ukiyo-e style. He is sometimes known as Katsukawa Shunsui, having taught Katsukawa Shunshō and founded the Katsukawa school style. Shunsui was the son and student of artist Miyagawa Chōshun; he was originally named Tōshirō, and chose Shunsui as his art-name (gō).

References

External links
 

18th-century Japanese artists
Katsukawa school